Llanrhydd or Llanrhudd is a parish one and a half miles south-west of Ruthin in Denbighshire, Wales; 'rhudd' being the Welsh name for 'red' – the colour of the local sandstone.

In a tiny rural hamlet a mile or so from the town centre, St Meugan's was the original mother-church of the Welsh settlement which became Ruthin. The pretty little 15th century building (dedicated to a hermit-saint from Caerleon in Gwent) contains many notable furnishings – above all the ‘rood screen’ which once supported a ‘rood’ or crucifix (also at Derwen).  The church probably dates back to the early 1500s and is a fine example of local carpentry: richly carved with intricate tracery, with an ‘ivy-berry’ trail (which is a Vale of Clwyd speciality) along its upper rail. The Georgian west gallery opposite (for choir and ‘church band’) is an even rarer survival, and is dated 1721, as such galleries were generally removed by the Victorians. Also rare  is the ornate 17th century altar table.

On the walls nearby are the intriguing monuments of the Thelwall family, who came to Ruthin with their de Grey overlords.  The oldest depicts Elizabeth John and Jane Thelwall with their ten sons and four daughters, all named and some holding skulls to show that they died before their parents. The ninth son Ambrose is again commemorated by a fine portrait bust: a courtier to three Stuart kings, he retired here in the ‘troublesome times’ of Republican rule and died in 1653.

In the churchyard (not far from the south porch) stands the decorated nine-foot shaft of a medieval preaching cross: and in the north-east corner is the gravestone of ‘Alfred Corbett, Tramp’ a popular figure who died in 1947.  A good guidebook is available in the church.

St Meugan's church is open by appointment.

References 

Villages in Denbighshire